Sauropus assimilis is an extremely rare species of plant in the family Phyllanthaceae. It is a tree growing in wet evergreen forests in lowlands. Endemic to southwestern Sri Lanka, and only known from the Sinharaja Biosphere Reserve there, evidence of its existence was last catalogued before 1991 (in a survey held between 1991 and 1996 by the National Conservation Review of Sri Lanka), and it has not been found since then. It may since have become extinct.

Sauropus assimilis was first collected for scientific examination and classification from Allagalla, in the Central Province of Sri Lanka, at an elevation of 3000 feet, by botanist George Henry Kendrick Thwaites. This high elevation, when compared with where it has been found more recently, would seem to indicate that the historic range of S. assimilis is much broader than it stands today. Thwaites described and published this species for the first time in 1861. The specific epithet "assimilis" is Latin, meaning "like" or "similar to": in Thwaites text, he indicates that the overall appearance of S. assimilis is similar to that of S. gardneriana (now known as S. gardnerianus, and considered to be synonymous with S. androgynus).

References

assimilis
Plants described in 1861
Flora of Sri Lanka
Critically endangered plants
Taxonomy articles created by Polbot